Vello Jaaska (born 23 September 1936) is an Estonian botanist.

He has described the following taxon: 
 Elymus nipponicus Jaaska, 1974

See also
List of botanists

References

20th-century Estonian botanists
1936 births
Living people
Place of birth missing (living people)